Lucas Ruiz Alonso (born March 7, 1996) is an Uruguayan footballer.

Career
Ruiz began his career in 2014 with River Plate Montevideo, where he played for one season, until now.

References

1996 births
Living people
People from Las Piedras, Uruguay
Uruguayan footballers
Club Atlético River Plate (Montevideo) players
Association football defenders
Uruguayan Primera División players